Heftye is a surname. Notable people with the surname include:

Henrik Heftye (1804–1864), Norwegian businessman and philanthropist
Johannes Thomassen Heftye (1792–1856), Norwegian businessman and politician
Thomas Heftye (1860–1921), Norwegian military officer, engineer, sports official and politician
Thomas Johannessen Heftye (1822–1886), Norwegian businessman, politician and philanthropist